Allocasuarina misera, commonly known as the small sheoak or the slender sheoak,  is a species of the Allocasuarina genu native to Australia.

The species is found heath or open woodland in sandy soil, often near the coast in isolated and scattered  populations across Victoria.

References

External links
  Occurrence data for Allocasuarina misera from The Australasian Virtual Herbarium

misera
Fagales of Australia
Flora of Victoria (Australia)
Plants described in 1989